The American grass bug (Acetropis americana) is a rare true bug found in the Willamette Valley of the U.S. state of Oregon.

References

Stenodemini
Hemiptera of North America